BER may refer to:

Biology and Medicine
 Basal electrical rhythm, spontaneous rhythmic slow action potentials that some smooth muscles of the GI tract display
 Base excision repair, DNA repair pathway
 Benign early repolarization
 Blossom end rot, plant disorder

Computing
 Basic Encoding Rules, a set of rules for encoding data that is described using the ASN.1 standard, for the purpose of transmission to a different computer system
 Bit error rate, the ratio between the number of incorrect bits transmitted to the total number of bits (E.800)
 Bleeding edge software release, an incremental, often daily distribution of the next version of a software package which has not yet been declared "stable"

Places
 Bermuda, British overseas territory, IOC and UNDP code
 Bohai Economic Rim, China

Transport
 Air Berlin, defunct German airline with ICAO code BER
 BER is the IATA code for Berlin Brandenburg Airport, opened in October 2020. It was formerly a metro area code encompassing the following airports in the Berlin region, Germany:
 Berlin-Tegel Airport (TXL), closed in November 2020, after the opening of BER
 Berlin-Tempelhof Airport (THF), closed in 2008
 Berlin-Schönefeld Airport (SXF), closed in October 2020, but became part of Berlin Brandenburg Airport

Other
 Berber language (ISO 639 alpha-3, ber)
 Beyond economic repair, rating of a damaged item
 Block Exemption Regulation (EU), Regulation published by the European Commission regarding European Union competition law
 Building the Education Revolution, a 2010 Australian government economic stimulus programme
 Building energy rating, rating label for buildings
 Chemische Berichte, chemistry journal
 B.E.R., band best known for their single "The Night Begins to Shine"